Government Engineer Vishwesarraiya Post Graduate College, also known as 'Govt e v p g college korba , is a coeducational post graduate college located in Korba, Chhattisgarh, India. Established in 1981, it is affiliated to Bilaspur University.

History
The college was established in 1981 and was originally affiliated to Pandit Ravishankar Shukla University. In 1985 it became affiliated to Guru Ghasidas Vishwavidyalaya and shifted to its current campus. In 2011 it became affiliated to Bilaspur University.

Academics
The college offers various three-year undergraduate programmes which grant B.A., B.Com or B.Sc. degrees and various two-year postgraduate programmes which grant M.A., M.Com or M.Sc degrees. It also offers one-year postgraduate diploma courses.

See also
Durga Mahavidyalaya, Raipur

References

External links
 

Universities and colleges in Chhattisgarh
Colleges affiliated to Atal Bihari Vajpayee Vishwavidyalaya
Korba, Chhattisgarh
Educational institutions established in 1981
1981 establishments in Madhya Pradesh